Mark Lerner (born September 1953) is an American businessman. He is the managing principal owner at Lerner Enterprises and principal owner of Major League Baseball's Washington Nationals.

Early life
Lerner is the son of Annette and Ted Lerner. He graduated from the George Washington University School of Business with a BBA in 1975.

Career
In 2006, Lerner's father purchased the Washington Nationals from MLB for $450 million. In 2018, his father retired and he stepped into the managing principal owner position.

Personal life
He is married to Judy Lenkin. In January 2017, Lerner learned he had spindle cell sarcoma above his left knee. After wounds related to radiation did not heal properly, his left leg was amputated in April of the same year.

Awards and honors
 2019 World Series Champion (as owner of the Washington Nationals)

References

George Washington University School of Business alumni
Jewish American baseball people
Washington Nationals owners
Businesspeople from Washington, D.C.
American amputees
1950s births
Living people